The 2015 Korea Open Super Series is the eighth Super Series tournament of the 2015 BWF Super Series. The tournament took place at SK Handball Stadium (Olympic Gymnasium 2) in Seoul, South Korea from September 15–20, 2015 and had a total purse of $600,000.
A qualification was held to fill four places in four disciplines (no qualification for women's doubles) of the main draws.

Men's singles

Seeds

Top half

Bottom half

Finals

Women's singles

Seeds

Top half

Bottom half

Finals

Men's doubles

Seeds

Top half

Bottom half

Finals

Women's doubles

Seeds

Top half

Bottom half

Finals

Mixed doubles

Seeds

Top half

Bottom half

Finals

References

External links
 Korea Open at www.bka.kr

Korea Open (badminton)
Korea Open
Korea Open
Sport in Seoul
September 2015 sports events in South Korea